Charles Birles Dawson December 17, 1892 - November 19, 1969) served in the California State Assembly for the 69th district from 1923 to 1925 and during World War I he served in the United States Army.

References

United States Army personnel of World War I
Republican Party members of the California State Assembly
20th-century American politicians
1892 births
1969 deaths